The Kleine Röder or Wilde Röder is a river in the east German state of Saxony.

Below Leppersdorf (a village in the borough of Wachau), the stream changes its course from southwest to north, following the general lie of the land. It flows through Kleindittmannsdorf with its four former water mills. On the edge of the mighty Okrilla Basin Sands (Okrillaer Beckensande) it swings west and discharges into the Große Röder in Cunnersdorf (a village in the borough Ottendorf-Okrilla). Its longest tributaries are, from the south, the Orla and, from the north, the Großnaundorfer Wasser.

There are frequent floods in the catchment area of the Kleinen Röder. Flood damage is recorded in the years 1958, 2002, 2006, 2010, 2011, 2012 and 2013. Ein großes Hochwasser trat am 12. und 13. August 2002 auf. There was particularly serious damage in Leppersdorf and Ottendorf-Okrilla. In addition, the plunge pool of the Kleindittmannsdorf Reservoir was destroyed.

See also 
List of rivers of Saxony

References 

Rivers of Saxony
Rivers of Germany